Frans van Dooren (2 November 1934, Ravenstein – 6 July 2005, Oss) was a Dutch translator of Italian and Latin literature.

1934 births
2005 deaths
Dutch male poets

People from Oss
Radboud University Nijmegen alumni
Italian–Dutch translators
Latin–Dutch translators
Translators of Dante Alighieri